Yuliya Vladimirovna Balykina (12 April 1984 – late October 2015) was a Belarusian sprinter.  At the 2012 Summer Olympics, she competed in the Women's 100 metres, and Women's 4 × 100 metres relay. Balykina tested positive for drostanolone in an out-of-competition doping test in June 2013 and was banned from competitive athletics for two years. Her period of ineligibility ended on 24 July 2015.

Balykina was reported as missing on 28 October 2015. She was found dead in a wooded area near Minsk on 16 November 2015. Balykina's body had been wrapped in plastic and a former boyfriend of hers confessed to the murder.

See also
List of solved missing person cases

References

External links

1984 births
2015 deaths
People from Bulgan Province
Belarusian female sprinters
Olympic athletes of Belarus
Athletes (track and field) at the 2012 Summer Olympics
Doping cases in athletics
Belarusian sportspeople in doping cases
Belarusian murder victims
People murdered in Belarus
2015 murders in Belarus
Female murder victims
Missing person cases in Belarus
Olympic female sprinters
Violence against women in Belarus